Ants Ruusmann (19 March 1935, Ristiküla – 25 December 2009) is an Estonian historian and politician. He was a member of IX Riigikogu.

He has been a member of Estonian Centre Party.

References

Living people
1935 births
2009 deaths
20th-century Estonian historians
Estonian Centre Party politicians
Members of the Riigikogu, 1999–2003
University of Tartu alumni
People from Saarde Parish